Osnago railway station is a railway station in Italy. Located on the Lecco–Milan railway, it serves the municipality of Osnago.

Services
Osnago is served by the line S8 of the Milan suburban railway service, operated by the Lombard railway company Trenord.

See also
 Milan suburban railway service

Notes

External links

Railway stations in Lombardy
Milan S Lines stations